Jewish medicine is medical practice of the Jewish people, including writing in the languages of both  Hebrew and Arabic. 28% of Nobel Prize winners in medicine have been Jewish, although Jews comprise less than 0.2% of the world's population.

History

Ancient
There are no extant texts of ancient medicine, as a first subject, of Hebrew origin. There was no medicine distinctly Jewish and instead Jewish practitioners had adopted Greek and later Graeco-Roman knowledge as practice.

A text known as the "Book of Remedies" is recorded of in the Babylonian Talmud twice, and the baraita, apparently dating to at least the reign of Hezekiah. Likewise, a text known as Sefer Refuot, which means "book of remedies", is known, however its composition has been dated roughly to the time of the Byzantine Empire anywhere between 1000 and 1700 years after Hezekiah.

Middle Ages
Further Information: Medieval medicine of Western Europe
The Book of Remedies, the earliest medical text written in Hebrew, to Asaph the Jew, dates to the seventh or eighth century. The text comprises four parts; a story of the transmission of medicine from God to mankind, a medical survey, a Materia medica and a list of medical aphorisms. While there is no knowledge of the writer himself or where the text was written, it circulated widely in Jewish communities during the Medieval period, and it can be assumed that it was of great influence to Jewish practitioners during this time.

Though advances were made in gynaecology during the Middle Ages, the texts about gynaecology were written using the masculine form of Hebrew, indicating that gynecological texts were directed towards male doctors, not female midwives. The only mention of midwives in these texts seems to be when direct contact with a woman’s genitalia is necessary; only then do texts specifically mention the women involved in the procedure. In one instance, a text advised the doctor to "order the midwife to massage the orifice of her womb" with the herbs mentioned.

Female practitioners contributed significantly both to the practice of medicine inside and outside of Jewish communities, and to the body of medical knowledge in Jewish community and beyond. From the surviving texts, it would seem that the greatest occurrence of female medical practitioners was during the 14th and 15th centuries. While women contributed to the advancement of Jewish medicine during this time, there were still a number of restrictions placed on them by society. No Jew, male or female, was permitted to attend a Christian university. This could be bypassed by taking an examination and acquiring a licentia curandi et practicandi, a license to practice medicine. In at least one case, this examination was specifically directed towards Jews who would work with Christian patients.

As a result, the education of these women largely fell to their male relatives.  Hava (also known as Hana), a Manoesque woman mentioned for her "medical capacity" in a document dated to the early 1320s, and Virdimura, a Sicilian who obtained her medical license in 1376, were female Jewish practitioners whose direct relatives—Hava's husband and sons, Virdimura's husband—were practitioners as well. Jewish medical practitioners were often educated in Greek, Latin, Arabic, and Hebrew, which gave them access to medical texts that were often inaccessible to their Christian counterparts. Working as physicians, surgeons, and midwives, Jewish women were accepted as medical authorities in Paris, Florence, Naples, and Sicily, among other cities. Sara of St. Gilles, for instance, was a Jewish doctor who admitted a male Christian student, Salvetus de Burgonovo, in fourteenth century France. Shatzmiller believes this is enough evidence to indicate that Sara taught female students as well. Mayrona, a Jewish woman from Manoesque, France, is listed in over forty documents from 1342 as a phisica, or a licensed medical practitioner. Jewish midwives made up a larger percentage of practitioners in some regions than their population would suggest. In the French town of Marseille between 1390 and 1415, there are 24 known Jewish practitioners to 18 Christian ones; this is a shift from the period from 1337 to 1362 where Jewish doctors compromised approximately half of all practitioners in Marseille.

Jewish practitioners participated in the exchange of knowledge between Christian and Muslim writers and practitioners. The degree to which Jewish women practiced midwifery in the Middle Ages depended largely on the areas in which they lived. In Iberia, for instance, Jews were well accustomed to a mix of Muslim, Christian, and their own Jewish culture. Along with this came a shared understanding of medicine; Jews living in this area even wrote medicinal texts in Judeo-Arabic (Arabic written in Hebrew letters) rather than standard Hebrew or the local vernacular Here, it was commonplace for Jewish midwives to work alongside Christian and Muslim women. However, Jewish women still faced adversity and discrimination on the basis of both their gender and their religion. This is more clearly demonstrated in Central Europe, where it is difficult to determine if Jewish midwives working for non-Jewish patients was common practice or, instead, the exception rather than the rule. In 1403, Floreta d’Ays, a Jewish midwife from Marseilles, was brought to court under charges of malpractice. This is the first such known case brought against a midwife and, according to Monica Green, an unusual case of anti-Jewish sentiment in an otherwise relatively tolerant town. While the end result of the trial is unknown, it's clear that Floreta's non-Christian status played a part in the charges levied against her.

The 17th century
The first organized study of Biblical medicine began during the 17th century.

20th century
The famous doctor of psychiatry Sigmund Freud was Jewish by birth. Abraham Maslow was born to Russian Jewish parents during 1908.

See also
Jewish medical ethics

References

External links
 hebrew-medical-terms

Hebrew medicine